Melanothrix latevittata is a moth in the family Eupterotidae. It was described by Karl Grünberg in 1914. It is found on Borneo. The habitat consists of upper montane forests.

References

Moths described in 1914
Eupterotinae